Kanuka may refer to:

 Kanuka or Kānuka (Kunzea ericoides), a shrub or tree endemic to New Zealand
 Kanooka (Tristaniopsis laurina), or water gum, an Australian rainforest tree
 Hill kanooka (Tristaniopsis collina), or hill water gum, an Australian rainforest tree
 Kanuka Clancy, a fictional character from Patlabor, an anime and manga franchise